National Wrestling Alliance (NWA) is an American professional wrestling promotion operating via its parent company Lightning One, Inc. The following is a list of its active and inactive/unofficial/defunct championships. The professional wrestling championships are not won through legitimate athletic competition; they are instead won via scripted endings to a match or on occasion awarded to a wrestler because of a storyline.

Active championships
NWA Worlds Heavyweight Championship
NWA World Women's Championship
NWA World Television Championship
NWA World Tag Team Championship
NWA World Women's Tag Team Championship
NWA National Championship
NWA World Junior Heavyweight Championship
NWA United States Tag Team Championship

Inactive/unofficial/defunct championships

World championships
NWA World Super Heavyweight Championship (Zero1 Version)
NWA World Junior Heavyweight Championship (Zero1 version)
NWA World Light Heavyweight Championship (CMLL version)
NWA World Light Heavyweight Championship (New Jersey version)
NWA World Light Heavyweight Championship (Australian version)
NWA World Middleweight Championship
NWA World Welterweight Championship
NWA World Historic Light Heavyweight Championship 
NWA World Historic Middleweight Championship 
NWA World Historic Welterweight Championship
NWA World Tag Team Championship (Amarillo version)
NWA World Tag Team Championship (Central States version)
NWA World Tag Team Championship (Chicago version)
NWA World Tag Team Championship (Georgia version)
NWA World Tag Team Championship (Florida version)
NWA World Tag Team Championship (Detroit version)
NWA World Tag Team Championship (Los Angeles version)
NWA World Tag Team Championship (Mid-America version)
NWA World Tag Team Championship (Mid-Atlantic version)
NWA World Tag Team Championship (Minneapolis version)
NWA World Tag Team Championship (San Francisco version)
NWA World Tag Team Championship (Texas version)
[[NWA Vancouver World Tag Team Championship|NWA World Tag Team Championship (Vancouver version)]]
NWA Independent World Heavyweight Championship (promoted by Sabu)
NWA World Brass Knuckles Championship (Tennessee version) 
NWA World Six-Man Tag Team Championship (Mid-Atlantic version)
NWA World Six-Man Tag Team Championship (Texas version)
NWA World Six-Man Tag Team Championship (Tennessee version)
NWA World Television Championship (Mid-Atlantic version)
National Women's Television Championship

National championships

NWA American Heavyweight Championship
NWA American Tag Team Championship
NWA Americas Heavyweight Championship
NWA Americas Tag Team Championship
NWA Austra-Asian Heavyweight Championship
NWA Austra-Asian Tag Team Championship
NWA Australian Heavyweight Championship
NWA British Empire Heavyweight Championship (Toronto version)
NWA British Empire Heavyweight Championship (Vancouver version)
NWA Canadian Heavyweight Championship (Calgary version)
NWA Canadian Heavyweight Championship (Halifax version)
NWA Canadian Heavyweight Championship (Toronto version)
NWA Canadian Heavyweight Championship (Vancouver version)
NWA Canadian Open Tag Team Championship
NWA Canadian Tag Team Championship (Calgary version)
NWA Canadian Tag Team Championship (Vancouver version)
NWA Canadian Television Championship
NWA Intercontinental Heavyweight Championship (CMLL version)
NWA Intercontinental Tag Team Championship
NWA International Heavyweight Championship (All-Japan Version)
NWA International Junior Heavyweight Championship
NWA International Junior Heavyweight Championship (Zero1 Version)
NWA International Light Heavyweight Championship (Toryumon Version)
NWA International Tag Team Championship (Toronto version)
NWA International Tag Team Championship (Vancouver version)
NWA International Tag Team Championship (All-Japan Version)
NWA International Tag Team Championship (Calgary Version)
NWA International Tag Team Championship (Maritimes Version)
NWA International Tag Team Championship (Georgia Version)
NWA International Lightweight Tag Team Championship
NWA Ireland Heavyweight Championship
NWA Ireland Tag Team Championship
NWA Mexico Welterweight Championship
NWA Mexico Lightweight Championship
NWA Mexico Tag Team Championship
NWA National Tag Team Championship
NWA National Television Championship
NWA New Zealand Heavyweight Championship
NWA North American Heavyweight Championship (Hawaii version)
NWA North American Heavyweight Championship (Tri-State version)
NWA North American Heavyweight Championship (Amarillo version)
NWA North American Heavyweight Championship (Calgary Version)
NWA North American Heavyweight Championship (Maritimes Version)
NWA North American Heavyweight Championship (WWC Version)
NWA North American Tag Team Championship (Central States version)
NWA North American Tag Team Championship (Florida version)
NWA North American Tag Team Championship (Los Angeles/Japan version) 
NWA North American Tag Team Championship (Puerto Rico/WWC version)
NWA Pan-Pacific Premium Heavyweight Championship (Zero1 Version)
NWA Pro Australia Tag Team Championship
NWA United National Championship (All-Japan Version)
NWA United National Heavyweight Championship (Zero1 Version)
NWA United States Heavyweight Championship (Mid-Atlantic/Georgia/WCW Version)
NWA United States Heavyweight Championship (Central States version)
NWA United States Heavyweight Championship (Chicago Version)
NWA United States Heavyweight Championship (Detroit version)
NWA United States Heavyweight Championship (Zero1 Version)
NWA United States Heavyweight Championship (Hawaii version)
NWA United States Heavyweight Championship (Indiana version)
NWA United States Heavyweight Championship (Rocky Mountains Version)
NWA United States Heavyweight Championship (St. Joseph Version)
NWA United States Heavyweight Championship (Toronto version)
NWA United States Junior Heavyweight Championship (Southeast Version)
NWA United States Junior Heavyweight Championship (Tri-State Version)
NWA United States Junior Heavyweight Championship (Mid-American Version)
NWA United States Junior Heavyweight Championship (Georgia Version)
NWA United States Tag Team Championship (Florida version)
NWA United States Tag Team Championship (Mid-American Version)
NWA United States Tag Team Championship (Mid-Atlantic version)
NWA United States Tag Team Championship (Northeast version)
NWA United States Tag Team Championship (Tri-State version)
NWA United States Tag Team Championship (Gulf Coast version)
NWA United States Women's Championship
NWA British Commonwealth Heavyweight Championship
NWA Canadian Heavyweight Championship
NWA Canadian Tag Team Championship
NWA International Lightweight Tag Team Championship
NWA North American Heavyweight Championship
NWA North American Tag Team Championship
NWA Scottish Heavyweight Championship
NWA United Kingdom Heavyweight Championship
NWA United Kingdom Junior Heavyweight Championship

Regional championships

NWA Alabama Heavyweight Championship
NWA Alberta Tag Team Championship
NWA Anarchy Heavyweight Championship
NWA Anarchy Tag Team Championship
NWA Anarchy Television Championship
NWA Anarchy Young Lions Championship
NWA Arizona Heavyweight Championship
NWA Arizona Tag Team Championship
NWA Arizona Women's Championship
NWA Arkansas Heavyweight Championship 
NWA Atlantic Coast Tag Team Championship
NWA "Beat the Champ" Television Championship
NWA Blue Ridge Heavyweight Championship
NWA Blue Ridge Tag Team Championship
NWA Blue Ridge Television Championship
NWA Blue Ridge Women's Championship
NWA Brass Knuckles Championship (Amarillo version)
NWA Brass Knuckles Championship (Florida version)
NWA Brass Knuckles Championship (Mid-Atlantic version)
NWA Brass Knuckles Championship (New England version)
NWA Brass Knuckles Championship (Southeastern version)''
NWA Carolinas Women's Championship
NWA Brass Knuckles Championship (Texas version)
NWA Brass Knuckles Championship (Tri-State version)
NWA California Heavyweight Championship
NWA Central States Tag Team Championship
NWA Central States Television Championship
NWA Charlotte Cruiserweight Championship
NWA Charlotte Heavyweight Championship
NWA Charlotte Legends Heavyweight Championship
NWA City of Laurel Tag Team Championship
NWA City of Mobile Heavyweight Championship
NWA City of Pensacola Heavyweight Championship
NWA Colorado Heavyweight Championship
NWA Dakota Outlaw Championship
NWA Dakota Tag Team Championship
NWA East Junior Heavyweight Championship
NWA East SEX Women's Championship
NWA East X Championship
NWA/ECCW Heavyweight Championship
NWA/ECCW Tag Team Championship
NWA European Heavyweight Championship
NWA Eastern States Heavyweight Championship
NWA Empire Heavyweight Championship
NWA Empire Lord of the Dance Championship
NWA Empire Tag Team Championship
NWA Florida Bahamian Championship
NWA Florida Heavyweight Championship
NWA Florida Junior Heavyweight Championship
NWA Florida Tag Team Championship
NWA Florida Television Championship
NWA Florida Global Tag Team Championship
NWA Florida Women's Championship
NWA Florida X Division Championship
NWA Force-1 Iron League Championship
NWA Force-1 Junior Heavyweight Championship
NWA FTA Championship
NWA FTA Dual Action Championship
NWA FTA United National Championship
NWA Georgia Heavyweight Championship
NWA Georgia Junior Heavyweight Championship
NWA Georgia Tag Team Championship
NWA Georgia Television Championship
NWA Gulf Coast Tag Team Championship
NWA Hawaii Heavyweight Championship
NWA Hawaii Tag Team Championship
NWA Heartland State Heavyweight Championship
NWA Heritage Championship
NWA Heritage Tag Team Championship
NWA Hollywood Television Championship
NWA Houston Outlaw Championship
NWA Idaho Heavyweight Championship
NWA Illinois Heavyweight Championship
NWA Indiana Heavyweight Championship
NWA Iowa Heavyweight Championship
NWA World Junior Heavyweight Title (Iowa Version)
NWA Louisiana Heavyweight Championship
NWA Macon Tag Team Championship
NWA Maryland Heavyweight Championship
NWA Massachusetts Heavyweight Championship
NWA Massachusetts Tag Team Championship
NWA Mid-Atlantic Heavyweight Championship
NWA Mid-America Heavyweight Championship
NWA Mid-America Tag Team Championship
NWA Mid-Atlantic Television Championship
NWA Midwest Heavyweight Championship
NWA Midwest Tag Team Championship
NWA Midwest Women's Championship
NWA Midwest X Division Championship
NWA Mississippi Heavyweight Championship
NWA Missouri Heavyweight Championship
NWA Mountain Empire Championship
NWA Mountain State Light Heavyweight Championship
NWA Nashville Television Championship
NWA New England Colonial Heavyweight Championship
NWA New England Heavyweight Championship
NWA New England Junior Heavyweight Championship
NWA New England Tag Team Championship
NWA New England Television Championship
NWA New England Women's Championship
NWA New England X Division Championship
NWA New Jersey State Heavyweight Championship
NWA Northeast Heavyweight Championship
NWA North Dakota Championship
NWA Ohio Heavyweight Championship
NWA Oklahoma Heavyweight Championship
NWA Oklahoma Women's Championship
NWA Oregon Heavyweight Championship
NWA Oriental Heavyweight Championship
NWA Oriental Tag Team Championship
NWA Pacific International Championship
NWA Pacific Coast Heavyweight Championship (San Francisco version)
NWA Pacific Coast Tag Team Championship (San Francisco version)
NWA Pacific Coast Heavyweight Championship (Vancouver version)
NWA Pacific Coast Tag Team Championship (Vancouver version)
NWA Pacific Northwest Heavyweight Championship
NWA Pacific Northwest Tag Team Championship
NWA Pacific Northwest Television Championship
NWA Women's Pacific/NEO Single Championship
NWA Panama City Heavyweight Championship
NWA Pennsylvania Heavyweight Championship
PWX Brass Knuckles Championship
PWX Heavyweight Championship
PWX Tag Team Championship
PWX Three Rivers Championship
NWA Rocky Mountain Heavyweight Championship
NWA San Joaquin Valley Tag Team Championship
NWA Southeastern Heavyweight Championship (Northern Division)
NWA Southeastern Continental Heavyweight Championship
NWA Southeastern Tag Team Championship
NWA Southeastern Continental Tag Team Championship
NWA Southeastern Tag Team Championship (Mid-American Version)
NWA Southeastern Television Championship
NWA Southeastern United States Junior Heavyweight Championship
NWA Southern Heavyweight Championship
NWA Southern Heavyweight Championship (Georgia version)
NWA Southern Heavyweight Championship (Knoxville version)
NWA Southern Heavyweight Championship (Mid-America version)
NWA Southern Heavyweight Championship (Tennessee version)
NWA Southern Junior Heavyweight Championship
NWA Southern Tag Team Championship (Florida version)
NWA Southern Tag Team Championship (Georgia version)
NWA Southern Tag Team Championship (Gulf Coast version)
NWA Southern Tag Team Championship (Knoxville version)
NWA Southern Tag Team Championship (Mid-America version)
NWA Southern Tag Team Championship (Mid-Atlantic version)
NWA Southern Women's Championship
NWA Southwest Heavyweight Championship  
NWA Southwest Junior Heavyweight Championship
NWA Tennessee Tag Team Championship
NWA Texas Junior Heavyweight Championship
NWA Tri-State Heavyweight Championship (Alabama Version)
NWA Tri-State Tag Team Championship (Alabama Version)
Ultimate NWA Heavyweight Championship
Ultimate NWA Tag Team Championship
NWA Upstate Six-Man Tag Team Championship
NWA Vancouver Island Heavyweight Championship
NWA Virginia Heavyweight Championship
NWA Virginia Tag Team Championship
NWA Virginia Women's Championship
NWA Western States Heavyweight Championship
NWA Western States Heritage Championship
NWA Western States Tag Team Championship
NWA Wildside Hardcore Championship
NWA Wildside Light Heavyweight Championship
NWA Wildside United States Heavyweight Championship
NWA Wisconsin Heavyweight Championship
NWA Wisconsin Tag Team Championship
NWA Wisconsin X Division Championship
NWA Wrestle Birmingham Heavyweight Championship
NWA Wrestle Birmingham Junior Heavyweight Championship
NWA Wrestle Birmingham Television Championship
NWA Affliction Heavyweight Championship
NWA British Commonwealth Heavyweight Championship
NWA Central States Heavyweight Championship
NWA Continental Heavyweight Championship
NWA Florida Global Tag Team Championship
NWA Houston Junior Heavyweight Championship
NWA Houston Women's Championship
NWA Kansas State Heavyweight Championship
NWA Intercontinental Tag Team Championship
NWA Lone Star Heavyweight Championship
NWA Lone Star Junior Heavyweight Championship
NWA Lone Star Tag Team Championship
NWA Lone Star Women's Championship
NWA Mid-Atlantic Heavyweight Championship
NWA Mid-Atlantic Heritage Championship
NWA Mid-Atlantic Tag Team Championship
NWA Mid-Atlantic Women's Championship
NWA Mid-South Unified Heavyweight Championship
NWA Mountain State Heavyweight Championship
NWA Mountain State Tag Team Championship
NWA New York No Limits Championship
NWA New York Tag Team Championship
NWA On Fire Heavyweight Championship
NWA On Fire Tag Team Championship
NWA On Fire Television Championship
NWA Upstate Heavyweight Championship
NWA New York Tag Team Championship
NWA Pacific Northwest Hardcore Championship
NWA Pacific Northwest SuperGirls Championship
NWA PURE Championship
NWA Southeastern Heavyweight Championship (Smoky Mountain)
NWA Supreme Heavyweight Championship
NWA Tennessee Tag Team Championship (Smoky Mountain)
NWA Southern Heavyweight Championship (Florida version)
NWA Southeast Heavyweight Championship
NWA Tennessee Heavyweight Championship
NWA Texas Heavyweight Championship
NWA Texas Tag Team Championship
NWA Texoma Heavyweight Championship
NWA Texoma TagTeam Championship
NWA Top of Texas Hardcore Championship
NWA Top of Texas Heavyweight Championship
NWA Top of Texas Junior Heavyweight Championship
NWA Top of Texas Panhandle Heavyweight Championship
NWA Top of Texas Tag Team Championship
NWA Top of Texas Women's Championship 
NWA Top Rope Junior Heavyweight Championship
NWA Top Rope Southern Tag Team Championship
NWA United Kingdom Central Counties Championship 
NWA Upstate Heavyweight Championship
NWA Virginia Alpha Heavyweight Championship
NWA Southeastern Heavyweight Championship
NWA Smoky Mountain Tag Team Championship
NWA Smoky Mountain Television Championship
NWA Mountain Empire Heavyweight Championship

See also
List of current champions in the National Wrestling Alliance
List of National Wrestling Alliance territories

References

190.^"NWA Intercontinental Heavyweight Title"  WrestlingTitles. Retrieved May 26, 2017

External links
 Official NWA website
 Official NWA YouTube channel
 Official NWA Facebook page

Jim Crockett Promotions championships
Championships
 
Professional wrestling-related lists